The Lamborghini Murciélago is a sports car produced by Italian automotive manufacturer Lamborghini between 2001 and 2010. Successor to the Diablo and flagship V12 of the automaker's lineup, the Murciélago was introduced as a coupé in 2001. The car was first available in North America for the 2002 model year. The Murciélago was Lamborghini's first new design in eleven years, and was also the brand's first new model under the ownership of German parent company Audi, which is owned by Volkswagen. The car is designed by Peruvian-born Belgian Luc Donckerwolke, Lamborghini's head of design from 1998 to 2005.

A roadster variant was introduced in 2003, followed by the more powerful and updated LP 640 coupé and roadster and a limited edition LP 650–4 Roadster. The final variation to wear the Murciélago nameplate was the LP 670–4 SuperVeloce, powered by the largest and final evolution of the original Lamborghini V12 engine. Production of the Murciélago ended on 5 November 2010, with a total production run of 4,099 cars. Its successor, the Aventador, was unveiled at the 2011 Geneva Motor Show.

Name
Lamborghini cars are often named after Spanish Fighting Bulls; the eponymous Murciélago was a leading sire after surviving an 1879 fight in Córdoba.  is the Spanish word for bat. In the Castilian Spanish spoken in most of Spain the word is pronounced , with a voiceless dental fricative  (as in English thing). However, the Italian automaker often uses the Southern Spanish and Latin American Spanish pronunciation, with an  sound.

Specifications

Engines

Variants

Murciélago (2001–2006)

The Murciélago is an all-wheel drive, mid-engine sports car. One of the vehicle's most distinguishing features is its scissor doors, a hallmark feature of flagship Lamborghini models. The first generation of the Murciélago was produced between 2001 and 2006 and was powered by a Lamborghini V12 that traces its roots back to the company's beginnings in the 1960s. The rear differential is integrated with the engine itself, with a viscous coupling centre differential transferring power to the front wheels. The total power distribution is 70 percent at the rear and 30 percent at the front. Power is delivered through a 6-speed manual transmission. The suspension utilised in the car uses an independent double-wishbone design, and the bodywork mostly features carbon fibre except for the steel roof and aluminium scissor doors. The active rear wing and the active air intakes integrated into the car's shoulders are electromechanically controlled, deploying automatically only at high speeds in an effort to maximise both aerodynamic and cooling efficiency. The interior was also made more comfortable and ergonomic than its predecessor sporting a simple and clean look with all the major controls along with the gearshift knob integrated into the central tunnel.

The first generation cars were known simply as Murciélago, sometimes Murciélago VT. Subsequent versions incorporated an alphanumeric designation to the name Murciélago, which indicated their engine orientation and output. However, the original Murciélago is never referred to as "LP 580".

Murciélago Roadster (2004–2006)

The concept car of the upcoming open-top variant was presented at the 2003 Detroit Motor Show as the Murciélago Barchetta. The production version called the Murciélago Roadster was introduced in 2004. Primarily designed to be an open-top car, it employed a manually attached soft roof as a cover from adverse weather, but a warning on the windshield header advised the driver not to exceed  with the roof in place. The roof which was made of fabric could be folded and fit into a leather bag supplied with the car in order to store it in the front compartment when not in use. The designer, Luc Donckerwolke used the B-2 stealth bomber, the Wally 118 WallyPower yacht, and architect Santiago Calatrava's Ciutat de Les Arts i Les Ciències in Valencia, Spain as his inspiration for the roadster's revised rear pillars and engine cover. The roadster weighs  more than the coupé due to the loss of the roof and the addition of chassis reinforcing components.

Murciélago LP 640 (2006–2010)

In March 2006, Lamborghini unveiled an updated version of the Murciélago at the Geneva Motor Show: the Murciélago LP 640. The new title incorporated the car's name, along with an alphanumeric designation which indicated the engine's orientation (Longitudinale Posteriore), and the updated power output. The exterior received a noticeable facelift, featuring revised front and rear fascias, and asymmetrical side air intakes, with the left side intake feeding an oil cooler. A new single outlet exhaust system incorporated into the rear diffuser, modified suspension system, revised programming, and upgraded clutch for the 6-speed "e-Gear" automated manual transmission with launch control rounded out the performance modifications. Interior seating was also re-configured in order to provide greater headroom, and a new stereo system formed part of the updated dashboard. Optional equipment included Carbon fibre-reinforced Silicon Carbide (C/SiC) ceramic composite brakes, chrome paddle shifters and a glass engine cover.

Murciélago LP 640 Roadster (2006–2010)

At the 2006 Los Angeles Auto Show, Lamborghini announced that the roadster version of the Murciélago would also be updated to LP 640 specifications.

Murciélago LP 670–4 SuperVeloce (2009–2010)

At the 2009 Geneva Motor Show, Lamborghini unveiled a high performance variant of the Murciélago, the LP 670–4 SuperVeloce. The SV moniker had previously appeared on the Diablo SV, as well as the Miura SV. The SV variants are more track-oriented than the normal production variants and are usually produced in limited numbers.

The air intakes were made bigger for better brake cooling and the front spoiler extended much farther for improved downforce. The engine cover was specially designed for the SV and consisted of three hexagonal plexiglass plates supported by a carbon fibre framework. The car's weight was also reduced by  through the extensive use of carbon fibre inside and out. A new, lighter exhaust system also helps in saving weight. The interior was also trimmed in Alcantara as a weight saving measure. As a result of the extensive weight loss, the SV has a power-to-weight ratio of 429 hp/long ton. The LP 640's optional 15-inch carbon-ceramic disc brakes with 6 piston callipers came as standard equipment with the car.

According to Maurizio Reggiani, head of Lamborghini R&D at the time, the LP 670–4 SV's steering was tuned for high-speed sensitivity. The original production plan of the ultimate Murciélago was limited to 350 cars. However, only 186 LP 670-4s were produced before the factory had to make room for the new Aventador production line. The chassis numbers of the total cars manufactured do not represent manufacturing order.

Limited editions

40th Anniversary Edition

In 2003, Lamborghini celebrated its 40th anniversary by introducing a limited production run of fifty 40th-Anniversary Edition Murciélagos. Enhancements over the standard car included a limited-edition blue body color that was called "Verde Artemis", carbon-fibre exterior detailing, upgraded wheels, a revamped exhaust system, and a numbered plaque on the inside of the rear window. The interior also featured unique leather trim.

LP 640 Versace

The Murciélago LP 640 Versace is a special limited edition of the LP 640 that was unveiled at the 2006 Paris Motor Show. Available in either white or black, only 20 were produced as both coupés and roadsters but only 8 were available for sale. Although the standard V12 engine was used, stylists from the Versace fashion house, and Lamborghini's Ad Personam program, collaborated to design custom interiors finished in two-toned Versace leather complemented with a Gianni Versace logo plaque on the centre console. Each unit came with matching Versace luggage, along with driving shoes and gloves. A matching watch from Versace's Precious Items department was also made available to customers.

LP 650–4 Roadster

In 2009, Lamborghini released a limited-run update of the Murciélago Roadster (50 units). Available only in Grigio Telesto gray with Arancio orange highlights, the color scheme was continued on the inside.

LP 670–4 SuperVeloce China Limited Edition (2010)
The LP 670–4 SuperVeloce China Limited Edition is a limited version of the LP 670–4 SuperVeloce for the Chinese market. It is distinguished by the middle stripe. Production was limited to 10 units.

Safety recall
In May 2010 in the United States, Lamborghini recalled 428 of its 2007–2008 Murciélago coupés and roadsters because of the possibility of weld failure on the fuel pump support inside the fuel tank, potentially leading to a fuel leak and possible fire.

Motorsport

R-GT

The Lamborghini Murciélago R-GT is a racing version of the Murciélago, developed jointly with Reiter Engineering and Audi Sport, and unveiled at the 2003 Frankfurt Motor Show. Unlike the standard car, the R-GT is rear-wheel drive only, and in order to comply with the FIA, ACO, and JAF rules, the car retains the standard V12 engine, but air restrictors are used to manage power. Acceleration and top speed performance are dependent on gearing, as different ratios are used for different tracks. Most sources report that around 7 original R-GTs were sold. This number doesn't include later derivatives such as the RG-1 or R-SV.

In March 2007, the All-Inkl.com Racing Murciélago won the Zhuhai 2 Hours. A Murciélago R-GT was entered into the 2008 24 Hours of Le Mans but was not classified.

In April 2009, beating a Corvette C6.R, and Saleen S7R, a Murciélago R-GT of the Russian IPB Spartak Racing Team won the GT1 class in the 1000 km de Catalunya, a LMS race. The drivers of the IPB Spartak Racing car were Russian, Roman Rusinov, and Dutch, Peter Kox. The Lamborghini made a pole position but was moved to the end of the grid due to some technical irregularities. They finished 2 laps ahead of the lead Corvette to take the second international win for a Lamborghini GT car.

RG-1

The Lamborghini Murciélago RG-1 was built for the Japan Lamborghini Owners Club (JLOC) to compete in Japanese Super GT series in 2004. In March 2006, the RG-1 recorded a win in the GT300 class at the Super GT Suzuka 500 km race.
RG-1LM
The Lamborghini Murciélago RG-1LM (alias: RGT-LM) is endurance version of Murciélago RG-1 specially developed for JLOC by Reiter Engineering and run in 24 Hours of Le Mans race in 2006.

LP 670 R-SV

The Lamborghini Murciélago LP 670 R-SV is an evolution of the R-GT developed by Reiter Engineering to comply with the FIA rules for the new FIA GT1 World Championship. It was unveiled at the 2010 24 Hours of Spa weekend. The 2010 FIA GT1 World Championship season saw Reiter run two cars and the other two were run by All-Inkl.com Münnich Motorsport. Reiter saw some success winning two Championship races finishing third in the teams' championship. The All-Inkl team did not have as much success finishing ninth in the championship. The 2011 season saw Swiss Racing Team run the ex-Reiter R-SV's, after an unsuccessful season in 2010 running Nissan GT-R's. All-Inkl has had a successful season so far topping the teams' championship as of round seven. Swiss Racing Team had some points finishes but after a crash between both cars at the Sachsenring round, they had a lack of spare parts and did not compete in the next three events. DKR Engineering announced that they would be using Murciélago R-SVs for the last 2 rounds of the season, instead of the Chevrolet Corvette C6.R that they were using for the first 8 rounds.

Related development

Lamborghini Miura concept

In January 2006, a retro-styled Lamborghini Miura concept car, built on a Murciélago chassis, was announced at the Museum of Television & Radio and promoted at the Los Angeles Auto Show, although the car itself was not present at the show. Subsequently, the Miura concept was officially debuted at the North American International Auto Show just two weeks later. It was the first design penned by Lamborghini's then design chief, Walter de'Silva, and commemorated the 40th anniversary of the 1966 introduction of the original Miura in Geneva.

Lamborghini president and CEO, Stefan Winkelmann, rejected any possibility of the concept marking the Miura's return to production, however, stating “The Miura was a celebration of our history, but Lamborghini is about the future. Retro design is not what we are here for. So we won’t do the Miura.”

Lamborghini Reventón

Debuted in 2007 at the Frankfurt Auto Show, the Lamborghini Reventón is a modified version of the Murciélago. The car's mechanical underpinnings and engine are identical to those of the Murciélago LP 640. However, cosmetics are all unique. Interior and exterior styling were inspired by stealth fighter design, taking cues from aircraft such as the F-22 Raptor. Only 21 units were built, of which one was retained by the factory to be exhibited in the Lamborghini museum. Lamborghini also produced 15 units of a roadster version.

Production

In popular culture 
The Murciélago is featured on the cover and in the car roster of the racing video game Need For Speed: Hot Pursuit 2. A Murciélago LP 640 in police livery is also featured in the promotional video of Need For Speed: Hot Pursuit alongside a Pagani Zonda Cinque.

The Murciélago Roadster was used in the 2005 film Batman Begins and the Murciélago LP 640 was used in its sequel The Dark Knight. It is used as Bruce Wayne's personal transport, with its name meaning "bat" connecting to his identity as "Batman". Lamborghini lent the production crew of The Dark Knight three Murciélago LP 640s to use in a chase scene. One of the cars was destroyed in the process.

The Murciélago is the titular Lamborghini referenced in the Kanye West song Mercy, though the actual car depicted in the music video is a Lamborghini Gallardo LP560-4.

References

Bibliography

External links

Murcielago
Roadsters
Coupés
Rear mid-engine, all-wheel-drive vehicles
2010s cars
Cars introduced in 2001
Cars discontinued in 2010
24 Hours of Le Mans race cars
Flagship vehicles